Justin Cooper may refer to:

Justin Cooper (Canadian football) (born 1982), Canadian football player
Justin Cooper (actor) (born 1988), American child actor
Justin Cooper (aide), senior aide to former United States President Bill Clinton
Justin D. Cooper, president of Redeemer University College
Justin Cooper (motorcyclist), American motorcycle racer